Ray McVilly (born 14 January 1937) is a former  Australian rules footballer who played with Hawthorn in the Victorian Football League (VFL).  McVilly retired at just 23 to take up coaching positions at Launceston, Balranald and suburban Melbourne clubs. 

McVilly later formed one of Melbourne’s most successful commercial cleaning companies, ‘What’s is Name Cleaning’.

Notes

External links 

Living people
1938 births
Australian rules footballers from Tasmania
Hawthorn Football Club players
North Hobart Football Club players